Crisanti is an Italian surname. Notable people with the surname include:

 Andrea Crisanti (1936–2012) – Italian production designer and art director
 Gabriele Crisanti (1935–2010) – Italian film producer
 Vincent Crisanti (born 1953) – Canadian city councillor in Toronto